23rd Street Lullaby is the second full-length album by singer-songwriter Patti Scialfa.  Released in 2004, a full 11 years after her debut, Rumble Doll, it finds her writing all the songs by herself, as well as co-producing the disc with Steve Jordan.

Reviews
Allmusic's Thom Jurek gave the disc four stars of five, saying that it is "a wise, grown-up record, yet it is guided by an untamed, wily heart."  He praised the "deceptively simple and immediately accessible" melodies & lyrics, yet says that "they open into swirling wells of emotion carried in the cradle of reminiscence and the heart of desire."

Track listing

Live tracks
There are three live tracks on a 2nd bonus disc (with limited edition copies)
"23rd Street Lullaby" 5:11
"Spanish Dancer" 4:55
"As Long As You Can Be" 5:14

Production
Produced By Steve Jordan & Patti Scialfa
Engineers – Roger Moutenot, Toby Scott, Trina Shoemaker, Eric Tew
Mixing – Bob Clearmountain
Mastering – Bob Ludwig

Personnel
Steve Jordan - drums, percussion, drum loops
Greg Cohen, Steve Jordan, Nils Lofgren, Willie Weeks - bass guitar
Clifford Carter, Patti Scialfa, Bruce Springsteen - keyboards
John Medeski - piano
Bobby Bandiera, Larry Campbell, Nils Lofgren, Marc Ribot, Patti Scialfa, Bruce Springsteen - guitar
Soozie Tyrell - violin
Jane Scarpantoni - cello
Tiffany Andrews, Steve Jordan, Michelle Moore, Antoinette Moore, Soozie Tyrell - backing vocals

References

Patti Scialfa, "23rd Street Lullaby" 2004, Columbia Records

Patti Scialfa albums
2004 albums
Columbia Records albums